The  Tennessee Titans season was the franchise's 44th season in the National Football League, the 54th overall, the 17th in the state of Tennessee and the third under head coach Mike Munchak. It was also the final season under the ownership of Bud Adams, who died on October 21. The Titans slightly improved on their 6–10 record from 2012, but missed the playoffs for a fifth consecutive season.

2013 draft class

Notes
 The Titans traded their original second- (No. 40 overall) and seventh- (No. 216 overall) round selections, along with their 2014 third-round selection to the San Francisco 49ers in exchange for the 49ers' second-round selection (No. 34 overall).
 The Titans traded their original sixth-round selection (No. 176 overall) to the Minnesota Vikings in exchange for the Vikings' 2012 seventh-round selection.
 Compensatory selection.

Staff

Final roster

Team captains
Jake Locker (QB) 
Nate Washington (WR)
Michael Roos (OT)
Jason McCourty (CB)
Bernard Pollard (SS)
Patrick Bailey (ST)

Schedule

Preseason

Regular season

Note: Intra-division opponents are in bold text.

Game summaries

Week 1: at Pittsburgh Steelers

The Steelers were on a disappointing run; Tennessee took advantage of this in 2012 and beat them at home by a score of 26-23, despite finishing at 6-10, while the Steelers went 8-8. In 2013, the Titans traveled to Pittsburgh for their season opener against the rival Steelers. They got off to a strong start, scoring a touchdown and 3 field goals for a 16-2 lead, as the Steelers could only manage a safety. In the fourth quarter, the Steelers cut the Titans' lead to 16-9 after they scored a touchdown. However, Tennessee ran out the clock, ensuring themselves a victory. With the convincing win, the Titans started the season at 1-0, but since the Colts beat the Raiders, 21-17, and the Texans later defeated the Chargers, 31-28, Tennessee tied for 1st place in the AFC South, since the Jacksonville Jaguars were humiliated, 28-2, at home by the Kansas City Chiefs.

Week 2: at Houston Texans

Week 3: vs. San Diego Chargers

For the first time since 1992 the Titans franchise defeated the Chargers, winning on a 34-yard touchdown throw from Jake Locker to Justin Hunter with 15 seconds to go.  Locker finished with 367 all-purpose yards – 299 passing yards, 68 rushing yards.  Chris Johnson finished with 90 rushing yards.

Week 4: vs. New York Jets

The Titans forced four Jets turnovers; Jake Locker threw three touchdowns off turnovers as the Titans led 24–6 at the half.  Locker was knocked out of the game in the third quarter following hits from Muhammad Wilkerson and Quinton Coples, suffering a right hip injury; a subsequent MRI showed no major damage to Locker's hip and he was sidelined for the next two games.  Ryan Fitzpatrick finished the game, throwing a 77-yard score to Nate Washington.  Geno Smith of the Jets was intercepted twice, but the most-popularized play came when he fumbled behind his back at the Titans goalline and Karl Klug fell on the touchdown.  Tennessee won 38–13.

Week 5: vs. Kansas City Chiefs

Week 6: at Seattle Seahawks

Week 7: vs. San Francisco 49ers

Week 9: at St. Louis Rams

The game was the first meeting between the Titans and their former coach, Jeff Fisher, and the first game for the club since the passing of its founder, Bud Adams. For the first time in 7 years, it was also quarterback Ryan Fitzpatrick's first return to St. Louis since he was traded from the Rams following the 2006 season. Fitzpatrick played his first 2 seasons in and was drafted 250th overall by St. Louis in 2005. The game lead tied or changed on every score as the Titans erupted to 198 rushing yards and four touchdowns on the ground.   Chris Johnson scored twice amid 170 all-purpose yards (150 on the ground) while Jake Locker overcame two interceptions to throw for 185 yards and run in a six-yard score.

Week 10: vs. Jacksonville Jaguars

Week 11: vs. Indianapolis Colts

Week 12: at Oakland Raiders

Week 13: at Indianapolis Colts

Week 14: at Denver Broncos

Week 15: vs. Arizona Cardinals

With the loss, coupled with the Miami Dolphins' win, the Titans were officially eliminated from playoff contention.

Week 16: at Jacksonville Jaguars

Week 17: vs. Houston Texans

Standings

Division

Conference

References

External links
 

Tennessee
Tennessee Titans seasons
Titans